Kalkfeld is a settlement in the Otjozondjupa Region of Namibia. It is situated halfway between Omaruru and Otjiwarongo on the national road C33 and belongs to the Omatako electoral constituency. Due to its location in former Damaraland, the majority of the inhabitants speak Khoekhoegowab or Otjiherero.

Economy and infrastructure
Kalkfeld was proclaimed a village in 1991 and governed by its own village council until 1996. It was then downgraded to settlement due to a lack of growth. The Namibian national newspaper referred to the settlement as "ghost town", situated in "the middle of nowhere". A business complex and a tourist centre are under construction.

Kalkfeld is served by a station of the Namibia Railway Network. Local residents often make use of donkey carts to get from point to point.

Education
There is one primary school, Kalkfeld Primary School in the location, and one secondary school, G.K. Wahl Combined School downtown, with only one class per grade as there are not a lot of children in the town, but know its 2020 there are a lot of people in the town of kalkfeld.

Tourism
 east of Kalkfeld lies Otjihaenamparero, a farm where 170-million-year-old dinosaur footprints can be seen.

See also 
 Railway stations in Namibia

References

Populated places in the Otjozondjupa Region